St. Joseph Catholic Church is a historic church at 105 N. Oak Street in Damar, Kansas, United States.  It was built in 1912 and added to the National Register in 2005.  It was designed in the Romanesque Revival architectural style.  The church recently underwent a restoration project, completed in 2007.

It has a copper roof that is "penny-thickness" which was installed in 1947.

Photo gallery

References

External links

Churches on the National Register of Historic Places in Kansas
Roman Catholic churches completed in 1912
Churches in the Roman Catholic Diocese of Salina
Romanesque Revival church buildings in Kansas
1912 establishments in Kansas
National Register of Historic Places in Rooks County, Kansas
20th-century Roman Catholic church buildings in the United States